I Don't Know Much, But I'll Say Everything is a 1973 French comedy film directed by Pierre Richard.

Plot 
Pierre Gastié-Leroy (Pierre Richard) is the son of a wealthy director of a factory of weapon manufacturing (Bernard Blier). Despite his parents, two generous uncles and a bishop godfather who try to inculcate in him the rigid values of his social level, Pierre is a dreamer, antimilitaristic, social educator who dreams of saving three thugs, his "little guys," at the limit of delinquency. After several resounding failures that sent him to prison, Pierre is ordered by his father to join his factory to direct the social service. Tired of the venality of his father and the foolishness of the "little guys", Pierre hires them at the factory. They will have fun making mischief and being overzealous to convince the supervisors on increasing the working rhythms, denouncing the trade union leaders, battling a strike and finally, stealing 500 tanks to sell them to the black market. A demonstration of new remote-controlled missiles attended by the Minister for Defence turns into a fiasco. Injured in his pride, the father Gastié-Leroy wants to show the reliability of his product by pointing the fire at his own factory.

Cast 
 Pierre Richard as Pierre Gastié-Leroy
 Bernard Blier as Monsieur Gastié-Leroy
 Didier Kaminka as Didier
 Luis Rego as Luis
 Georges Beller as Georges
 Pierre Tornade as the police commissioner
 Daniel Prévost as Morel
 Danièle Minazzoli as Danou, the nurse
 Nicole Jamet as Nicole
 Hélène Duc as Madame Gastié-Leroy
 Francis Lax as Antoine
 Pierre Repp as Vernier, the factory director
 Jean Obé as Oncle Léon, godfather of Philippe
 André Thorent as Oncle Jean
 Michel Delahaye as Oncle Paul
 Xavier Depraz as Général Deglane
 Jean Saudray as Morin
 François Cadet as Félix
 Victor Lanoux as a laborer
 Teddy Vrignault as Staflikevitch, the Bulgarian
 André Gaillard as the Social Security employee
 France Rumilly as Laurence Deglane

References

External links 

1973 films
French comedy films
1973 comedy films
1970s French films